Kadirenigudem or Kadireni Gudem is a village in Nalgonda district, Telangana, India.

Notable people 
Laxman Aelay (born 1965), artist

References 

Villages in Nalgonda district